Tumba Silva (born April 20, 1986 in Luanda) is an Angolan boxer. At the 2012 Summer Olympics, he competed in the Men's heavyweight, but lost in a walkover to Clemente Russo in the first round after missing the weigh-in.

References

External links
 

Angolan male boxers
Living people
1986 births
Olympic boxers of Angola
Boxers at the 2012 Summer Olympics
Heavyweight boxers
Sportspeople from Luanda